Karnal Lok Sabha constituency, in Karnal district, is one of the 10 Lok Sabha (parliamentary) constituencies in Haryana state in northern India.

Assembly segments
At present, Karnal Lok Sabha constituency comprises Nine Vidhan Sabha (legislative assembly) constituencies. These are:

Members of Parliament

^ by-poll

Election Results

See also
 Karnal district
 Panipat district
 List of Constituencies of the Lok Sabha

References

Lok Sabha constituencies in Haryana
Karnal district